Fal (also Romanized as Fāl and Fāll) is a village in Fal Rural District, Galleh Dar District, Mohr County, Fars Province, Iran. At the 2006 census, its population was 3,368, in 652 families.

References 

Populated places in Mohr County